An air speed record is the highest airspeed attained by an aircraft of a particular class. The rules for all official aviation records are defined by Fédération Aéronautique Internationale (FAI), which also ratifies any claims. Speed records are divided into multiple classes with sub-divisions. There are three classes of aircraft: landplanes, seaplanes, and amphibians; then within these classes, there are records for aircraft in a number of weight categories. There are still further subdivisions for piston-engined, turbojet, turboprop, and rocket-engined aircraft. Within each of these groups, records are defined for speed over a straight course and for closed circuits of various sizes carrying various payloads.

Timeline

Gray text indicates unofficial records, including unconfirmed or unpublicized war secrets.

Official records versus unofficial
The record was set on 28 July 1976 by Eldon W. Joersz and George T. Morgan Jr. near Beale Air Force Base, California, USA. It was able to take off and land unassisted on conventional runways. SR-71 pilot Brian Shul claimed in The Untouchables that he flew in excess of Mach 3.5 on 15 April 1986, over Libya, in order to avoid a missile.

The chaos and secrecy of World War II meant that new speed breakthroughs were neither publicized nor ratified. The first aircraft to exceed the unofficial October 1941 record of the Me 163A V4 was the Douglas D-558-1 Skystreak, which achieved  in August 1947.

The original record holding Macchi-Castoldi M.C.72 MM.181 seaplane is at the Air Force Museum at Vigna di Valle in Italy.

Other air speed records

Flying between any two airports allow a large number of combinations, so setting a speed record ("speed over a recognised course") is fairly easy with an ordinary aircraft, although there are many administrative requirements for recognition.

See also
 Flight altitude record
 Fastest propeller-driven aircraft
 List of vehicle speed records
 Lockheed X-7 - Mach 4.31 (2,881 mph) in the 1950s
 Messerschmitt Me 163 Komet
 World record

References

 Allward, Maurice. Modern Combat Aircraft 4: F-86 Sabre. London: Ian Allan, 1978. .
 Andrews, C.F. and E.B. Morgan. Supermarine Aircraft since 1914. London:Putnam, 1987. .
 Belyakov, R.A. and J. Marmain. MiG: Fifty Years of Secret Aircraft Design. Shrewsbury, UK:Airlife, 1994. .
 Bowers, Peter M. Curtiss Aircraft 1907–1947. London:Putnam, 1979. .
 Cooper, H.J. "The World's Speed Record". Flight, 25 May 1951, pp. 617–619.
 "Eighteen Years of World's Records". Flight, 7 February 1924, pp. 73–75.
 Francillon, René J. McDonnell Douglas Aircraft since 1920. London:Putnam, 1979. .
 James, Derek N. Gloster Aircraft since 1917. London:Putnam, 1971. .
 Mason, Francis K. The British Fighter since 1912. Annapolis Maryland, US: Naval Institute Press, 1992. .
 Munson, Kenneth and John William Ransom Taylor Jane's Pocket Book of Record-breaking Aircraft. New York New York, US: Macmillan, 1978. .
 Taylor, H. A. Fairey Aircraft since 1915. London:Putnam, 1974. .
 Taylor, John W. R. Jane's All The World's Aircraft 1965–66. London:Sampson Low, Marston & Company, 1965.
 Taylor, John W. R. Jane's All The World's Aircraft 1976–77. London:Jane's Yearbooks, 1976. .
 Taylor, John W. R. Jane's All The World's Aircraft 1988–89. Coulsdon, UK:Jane's Defence Data, 1988. .
 Organ, Richard Avro Arrow: The Story of the Avro Arrow From Its Evolution To Its Extinction. Erin, ON, Canada: Boston Mills Press, 1980. .

External links 
 Web site of the Fédération Aéronautique Internationale (FAI)
 Speed records time line
 Speed Record Club - The Speed Record Club seeks to promote an informed and educated enthusiast identity, reporting accurately and impartially to the best of its ability on record-breaking engineering, events, attempts and history.
 Ground Speed Records - Breakdown of speed records by aircraft type

Aviation records
Air racing
Airspeed
Flight